The 19th Lambda Literary Awards were held in 2007, to honour works of LGBT literature published in 2006.

Special awards

Nominees and winners

External links
 19th Lambda Literary Awards

Lambda Literary Awards
Lambda
Lists of LGBT-related award winners and nominees
2007 in LGBT history
2007 awards in the United States